Primavera en otoño is a 1933 Spanish-language American romantic comedy directed by Eugene Forde and stars Catalina Bárcena.

Plot
Agustina has been away at school when she returns home to Madrid to see the mother she hasn't seen in over eight years. Delighted at the visit, Agustina's mother, Elena, is dismayed at her daughter's conservative appearance. Elena re-does Agustina's dress, which Agustina's boyfriend, Manolo, disapproves of when he arrives the next day. When Agustina's father Enrique arrives to woo Elena to return to him, he sees that the only way that Manolo's parents will approve of his marriage to Agustina is if he can remove Agustina from Elena's influence. He invites Elena to return with him to his ranch, but Elena wishes to remain in Madrid and pursue her opera career. The two live apart so that Enrique can see to his ranch while she pursues her career.

Agustina guilts her mother into going to the ranch, and the two, along with a coterie of Elena's friends, as well as Manolo, travel to visit Enrique. The large group quickly makes themselves at home. As the group cavorts scantily clad outfits, Manolo is angered by Agustina's lack of decorum. Agustina leaves in a huff, followed by a friend of her mother's, Juan Manuel, an attaché of the Brazilian Embassy in Madrid. Caught in a storm, the couple seeks shelter in the caretaker's cottage on Enrique's farm.

Meanwhile, Enrique orders Elena's friends to leave his ranch, which they do, however Elena begins to pack to follow them. When Juan and Agustina return to the main house, Juan seeks out Elena to tell her that he has fallen in love with her daughter. Delighted at the news, she embraces him, which is seen by Enrique, who gets the wrong impression and orders Juan from his home. However Juan returns the next morning and proposes to Agustina, she accepts and the two leave on their way to Juan's next post in Tokyo.

Enrique, realizing his mistaken jealousy, chases after Elena, who is about to board a steamship. Knowing they love one another, but not knowing whether they should return to the ranch or to Madrid, they flip a coin. When it lands in the water, they decide to split their time between the two.

Cast
 Catalina Bárcena as Elena Montero
 Antonio Moreno as Enrique
 Mimi Aguglia as Rosina
 Luana Alcañiz as Agustina
 Julio Peña as Manolo Fresneda
 María Calvo as Ama Justa
 Agostino Borgato as Empresario
 Hilda Moreno as Nena Torres
 Raúl Roulien as Juan Manuel Valladares
 Romualdo Tirado as Antonio
 Adrienne D'Ambricourt as Montresor

References

 
 

1933 romantic comedy films
American romantic comedy films
1930s Spanish-language films
Spanish-language American films
Films directed by Eugene Forde
American films based on plays
American black-and-white films
1933 films
1930s American films